Luis Miguel Quezada Sánchez, also known as Luismi Quezada (born 11 February 1996), is a Spanish-born Dominican professional footballer who plays as either a left-back or a left winger for Japanese club, Tokushima Vortis and the Dominican Republic national team.

Club career
Born in Madrid to a Dominican father, Quezada joined Real Madrid's youth setup in 2006, after representing UD San Sebastián de los Reyes and DAV Santa Ana. On 18 January 2015, while still a junior, he made his senior debut with the C-team by coming on as a late substitute for Philipp Lienhart in a 0–1 Tercera División away loss against CF Rayo Majadahonda.

On 17 July 2015, after finishing his formation, Quezada was loaned to Segunda División B side UE Olot, for one year. Upon returning from loan, he was assigned to the reserves also in the third level.

Quezada scored his first senior goal on 12 February 2017, netting the equalizer in a 2–1 home defeat of CF Fuenlabrada. He made his first team debut on 28 November, replacing fellow debutant Óscar Rodríguez in a 2–2 home draw against the same team, for the season's Copa del Rey.

On 17 August 2018, Quezada was loaned to Segunda División side Córdoba CF for the campaign. On 2 September of the following year, he signed a permanent two-year deal with fellow league team Cádiz CF.

In 2022, Quezada signed transfer to uzbekistani club, Surkhon Termez.

On 10 January 2023, Quezada officially transfer to J2 club, Tokushima Vortis for upcoming 2023 season.

International career
On 9 October 2015, Quezada played the entire second half of a 0–6 non-FIFA friendly loss for the Dominican Republic senior national team against the Brazil Olympic team.

References

External links
Real Madrid official profile

1996 births
Living people
Spanish people of Dominican Republic descent
Sportspeople of Dominican Republic descent
Citizens of the Dominican Republic through descent
Footballers from Madrid
Dominican Republic footballers
Dominican Republic under-20 international footballers
Dominican Republic international footballers
Dominican Republic people of Spanish descent
Association football defenders
Association football wingers
Segunda División players
Segunda División B players
Tercera División players
Real Madrid C footballers
UE Olot players
Real Madrid Castilla footballers
Real Madrid CF players
Córdoba CF players
Cádiz CF players
Dominican Republic youth international footballers
Expatriate footballers in Uzbekistan
Uzbekistan Super League players
Surkhon Termez players
J2 League players
Tokushima Vortis players